"Forget About Love" is a song by American singer-songwriter Eddie Money, which was released in 1989 as a track on his seventh studio album Nothing to Lose. It was written by Money, Richie Zito, Tom Whitlock and Todd Cerney, and produced by Zito and Money. The song reached No. 36 on the Billboard Album Rock Tracks chart.

Background
"Forget About Love" was inspired by Money's separation from his first wife, Margo Lee Walker, and having a daughter with his new fiancée, Laurie Harris, in 1988. He told the Pittsburgh Post-Gazette in 1988, "I still love my wife, but I wanted a baby. Now I have one, and she's beautiful – it's just unfortunate my wife didn't have her. 'Forget About Love' [is] about that, how it came down. I'm happy with the baby, but I miss my wife." He added in an interview with the Scripps Howard News Service in 1989, "I wrote 'Forget About Love' as if she was singing it to me."

Critical reception
In a review of Nothing to Lose, Steve Persall of the Tampa Bay Times noted, "Money's best outlook on love is when he plays the tough romantic on [songs such as] 'Forget About Love'." He felt the song had a "solid hook" and "entertaining arrangement". Kevin Connal of The Boston Globe described it as "an incessant rock song with a melodic surge of keyboards chiming out".

Personnel
Production
 Richie Zito, Eddie Money – producers, arrangers
 Phil Kaffel – engineer, mixing
 Julian Stoll – assistant engineer
 Stan Katayama, Jim Dineen, Toby Wright, Tom Johnson – assistant mixers

Charts

References

1989 songs
Eddie Money songs
Songs written by Eddie Money
Songs written by Tom Whitlock
Songs written by Todd Cerney
Song recordings produced by Richie Zito